WHOC is a News/Talk/Sports formatted broadcast radio station.  The station is licensed to Philadelphia, Mississippi and serves Philadelphia and Neshoba County in Mississippi.  WHOC is owned and operated by WHOC, Inc.

Translator
In addition to WHOC's primary frequency, its programming is simulcast on the following translator station, on the FM band, to widen WHOC's broadcast area.

References

External links
 1490AM and 93.7FM WHOC Online
 

1948 establishments in Mississippi
News and talk radio stations in the United States
Sports radio stations in the United States
Radio stations established in 1948
HOC